Joseph Drake is an American film producer, best known for founding Mandate Pictures and Good Universe  with Nathan Kahane.   Drake has served as executive producer on more than 25 films.

Career 

Early in his career, Drake served posts at Rysher Entertainment, Senator International and Moviestore Entertainment.

Drake previously served as president and Co-Chief Operating Officer of the Lionsgate Motion Picture Group. At Lionsgate, he oversaw the launch of Hunger Games and The Expendables franchises. In 2012, along with Kahane, he launched Good Universe.

Good Universe entered into a partnership with Seth Rogen and Evan Goldberg’s Point Grey Pictures to produce and finance mainstream comedies such as the Untitled Ben Schwartz Comedy with Gary Sanchez Productions to be directed by Adam McKay and starring Rogen and James Franco's The Masterpiece for New Line Cinema.

Drake is also a partner with Sam Raimi, Robert Tapert and Kahane in Ghost House Pictures, specialising in horror films. Releases include Fede Álvarez's Don't Breathe, The Grudge and Evil Dead for Sony Pictures.

Drake founded Mandate Pictures in 2005, following a management buyout of Senator International which he launched in 2001. Mandate Pictures produced Juno, the Harold & Kumar Go to White Castle franchise; Young Adult (film), Hope Springs and This is the End.  In 2007, the partners sold Mandate Pictures to Lionsgate. Following the acquisition of Mandate, Drake transitioned into his role as the President of the Lionsgate Motion Picture Group and Co-chief Operating Officer of Lionsgate, while maintaining his role as CEO of Mandate Pictures.

Filmography
He was a producer in all films unless otherwise noted.

Film

Miscellaneous crew

Production manager

Thanks

Television

References

External links 
 

American chief executives
American film producers
Living people
Place of birth missing (living people)
Year of birth missing (living people)
Date of birth missing (living people)